USS Frolic is a name used more than once by the United States Navy, and may refer to:

 , a sloop of war in active service during 1814 until captured by the British during the War of 1812
 , a patrol yacht in commission in 1898, from 1900 to 1906, and from 1906 to 1907
 , a schooner in non-commissioned service from 1917 to 1918

United States Navy ship names